Underground Hero is the seventh studio album by American rapper MC Eiht. It was released on July 2, 2002, via D3/Riviera Entertainment. Recording sessions took place at Mad Hatter Studios in Hollywood. Production was handled by Big Resse, Daven the Mad Hatter, Mr. Tony, Narcotic, Nic & Tone, The Platinum Brothers and Young Tre. It features guest appearances from Mack 10, Sticky Fingaz, Yukmouth, and the Outlawz. The album peaked at number 54 on the Billboard Top R&B/Hip-Hop Albums and number 23 on the Independent Albums chart in the United States.

Track listing

Personnel
Aaron "MC Eiht" Tyler – vocals, executive producer
Dedrick "Mack 10" Rolison – vocals (track 3), associate executive producer
Jerold "Yukmouth" Ellis Jr. – vocals (track 5)
Kirk "Sticky Fingaz" Jones – vocals (track 16)
Outlawz – vocals (track 19)
Omar Sharif – associate executive producer
Ed Farris – mixing
Bobby Bee – mastering
Humberto "DJ Primer" Cuentas – assistant engineering
Tyler Roes – assistant engineering
Brian Porizek – artwork
Debra Young – photography
Paul Modiano – marketing

Charts

References

External links

2002 albums
MC Eiht albums